Ryoo Chang-kil (born 5 November 1940) is a North Korean football defender who played for North Korea in the 1966 FIFA World Cup. He also played for Kikwancha Pyongyang.

References

1940 births
North Korean footballers
North Korea international footballers
Association football defenders
1966 FIFA World Cup players
Living people